Geoffrey William Evans (born ) is a former England international rugby union footballer. He toured South Africa in 1974 with the British and Irish Lions and at the time played club rugby for Coventry R.F.C.

References

1950 births
Living people
English rugby union players
British & Irish Lions rugby union players from England
England international rugby union players
Coventry R.F.C. players